Decision House is a reality television series in which couples enter on-camera therapy to save marriages. It debuted on MyNetworkTV in September 2007 and aired for only one season. Executive producers were Dan Jbara and Jay McGraw, son of Dr. Phillip McGraw.  Its theme song, "Make It Right," was written by singer Kari Kimmel.

References
MyNetwork takes it on the chin, rebounds

External links

MyNetworkTV original programming
2007 American television series debuts
2008 American television series endings
2000s American reality television series